Abraham González International Airport  is an international airport located in Ciudad Juárez, Chihuahua, Mexico, near the Mexico–United States border opposite El Paso, Texas. It accommodates national and international air traffic of the city of Ciudad Juárez. It is named after Governor Abraham González of the State of Chihuahua.

In 2013, Volaris initiated over 25 weekly flights departing Ciudad Juárez.

In 2021, Abraham González International Airport handled 1,499,841 passengers, and in 2022 it handled 2,004,524 according to Grupo Aeroportuario Centro Norte.

Airlines and destinations

Passengers

Cargo

Statistics

Passengers

Busiest routes

See also

 List of the busiest airports in Mexico

References

External links
 Abraham González International Airport
 Grupo Aeroportuario Centro Norte de México

Airports in Chihuahua (state)
Ciudad Juárez